Phyllodes eyndhovii is a noctuoid moth in the family Erebidae, subfamily Calpinae. The species was first described by Samuel Constantinus Snellen van Vollenhoven in 1858. It is found in the Himalayas, western China, Taiwan, Thailand, Sundaland and Palawan.

The larvae feed on Acacia species

References

Erebidae
Moths of Borneo
Moths described in 1858
Taxa named by Samuel Constantinus Snellen van Vollenhoven